Carlo Carafa della Spina (1611–1680) was a Roman Catholic cardinal.

Biography
On 1 Jan 1645, he was consecrated bishop by Ciriaco Rocci, Cardinal-Priest of San Salvatore in Lauro, with Fabio Lagonissa, Titular Patriarch of Antioch, and Alfonso Gonzaga, Titular Archbishop of Rhodus, serving as co-consecrators.

Episcopal succession

References

1611 births
1680 deaths
17th-century Italian cardinals
Apostolic Nuncios to the Holy Roman Empire
Apostolic Nuncios to the Republic of Venice
Apostolic Nuncios to Switzerland
Clergy from Rome